Zelzate is a municipality located in the Belgian province of East Flanders. The municipality only comprises the town of Zelzate proper. In 2021, Zelzate had a total population of 13,124. The total area is 13.71 km2.

Zelzate is divided into two parts by the Ghent–Terneuzen Canal. There is a concrete drawbridge and a tunnel to connect the two sides. Zelzate is known for the nearby polluting industry, which makes it the village with the lowest air quality in the country. Recently ArcelorMittal Ghent (Sidmar) made a major investment which resulted in an emission decrease of 90%.

Notable citizens
 Eric Verpaele (b. Zelzate, 2 February 1952), writer 
 Eddy Wally (b. Zelzate, 12 July 1932), singer

Sister cities
The town is twinned with:
Aubenas (France)
Cesenatico (Italy)
Delfzijl (Netherlands) (Not longer twinned with)
Schwarzenbek (Germany)
Sierre (Switzerland)

References

External links

Official website  

Municipalities of East Flanders
Populated places in East Flanders